Richard Lee Jackson (born May 29, 1979) is an American drummer and actor. Since 2004, he plays drums in American band Enation, of which his brother, Jonathan Jackson, the lead singer.

Early life
Jackson was born in Redlands, California, the son of an amateur ventriloquist and businesswoman, and a family physician, country musician and Congressional candidate in the state of Washington. In 1993, he played Jason Lee Scott's cousin Jeremy on the Mighty Morphin Power Rangers episode "The Rockstar". He also starred as Ryan Parker in Saved by the Bell: The New Class.

References

External links
Official website

American male television actors
Living people
1979 births
Male actors from Washington (state)
American male film actors
20th-century American male actors
21st-century American male actors
People from Battle Ground, Washington
People from Redlands, California
Enation (band) members